Olcan McFetridge (born 1963 in Armoy, County Antrim) is an Irish former sportsperson.  He played hurling with his local club Armoy and was a member of the Antrim senior inter-county team in the 1980s and 1990s.

References

1963 births
Living people
Armoy hurlers
Antrim inter-county hurlers
Ulster inter-provincial hurlers